Francesc Bonet Caruncho (born 21 July 1993) is a Spanish professional football manager who is the  head coach for I-League club Gokulam Kerala.

Early life

Coaching career

Rajasthan United 
In December 2021, I-League club Rajasthan United appointed Francesc Bonet as the head coach for 2021-22 season.

Gokulam Kerala
On 27 December 2022, Bonet was appointed as the new coach of Gokulam Kerala. He replaced Cameroonian Richard Towa after the defending champion played nine matches in the 2022–23 I-League season.

Managerial statistics

References

External links 

1993 births
Living people
Spanish football managers
Spanish expatriate football managers
Gokulam Kerala FC managers
Expatriate football managers in India
Spanish expatriate sportspeople in India